The Virginia Slims Championships was held twice in 1986 because of a change of schedule from March to November.

They were the fifteenth and sixteenth season-ending WTA Tour Championships, the annual tennis tournament for the best female tennis players in singles on the 1986 WTA Tour. It was held in March 1986 and November 1986, in New York City, United States.

Champions

March

 Singles:  Martina Navratilova defeated  Hana Mandlíková, 6–2, 6–0, 3–6, 6–1. Navratilova was the defending champion.
 Doubles:  Hana Mandlíková and  Wendy Turnbull defeated  Claudia Kohde-Kilsch and  Helena Suková, 6–4, 6–7(4–7), 6–3.

November

 Singles:  Martina Navratilova defeated  Steffi Graf, 7–6(8–6), 6–3, 6–2. Navratilova was the defending champion.
 Doubles:   Martina Navratilova and   Pam Shriver defeated  Claudia Kohde-Kilsch and  Helena Suková, 7–6(7–1), 6–3.

References

External links 

 Official website

 March WTA edition details
 March ITF edition details

 November WTA edition details
 November ITF edition details

Tennis tournaments in the United States
WTA Tour Championships
Virg
1986 Virginia Slims World Championship Series
1986 in American tennis
1986 in sports in Florida